The Manhattan Institute for Policy Research (renamed in 1981 from the International Center for Economic Policy Studies) is a conservative American think tank focused on domestic policy and urban affairs, established in Manhattan in 1978 by Antony Fisher and William J. Casey, a former CIA director. The institute has produced books, articles, interviews, speeches, op-eds, and the quarterly publication City Journal.

History

Foundational years (1978–1980)
The International Center for Economic Policy Studies (ICEPS) was founded by Antony Fisher and William J. Casey in 1978. ICEPS changed its name to the Manhattan Institute for Policy Research in 1981. The institute's first president was Jeffrey Bell, who was succeeded in 1980 by William H. Hammett, who served until 1995. In 1980, the institute (then ICEPS) began publishing its Manhattan Report on Economic Policy, a monthly periodical featuring briefs by leading market economists and analysts. David Asman was the first editor of the reports and continued the post until 1982.

Reagan-era activity (1981–1989)
During the early 1980s, the institute published several books on supply-side economics and the privatization of services. In 1981, Institute program director George Gilder published Wealth and Poverty, a book that some reviewers called the "bible" of the Reagan administration; the book focused on questioning the character of the poor, saying that "the current poor, white even more than black, are refusing to work hard." A New York Times reviewer called it "A Guide to Capitalism", arguing that it offered "a creed for capitalism worthy of intelligent people", but noted that it was alternately astonishing and boring, "persuasive and sometimes highly questionable." The book was a New York Times bestseller and eventually sold over a million copies.

Other books on supply-side economics published during this era include The Economy in Mind (1982), by Warren Brookes, and The Supply-Side Solution (1983), edited by Timothy Roth and Bruce Bartlett. The institute sponsored a documentary film, "Good Intentions", in 1983 based on the book, The State Against Blacks by Walter E. Williams. The film debuted on New York area public TV station WNET on June 27, and presented Williams's thesis that government policies have done more to impede than to encourage black economic progress.

In 1982, the institute paid Charles Murray to write Losing Ground, published in 1984.

The City Journal (1990–2000)

In 1990, the institute founded its quarterly magazine, City Journal. The magazine was edited by Peter Salins and then Fred Siegel in the early 1990s. Fortune editor Myron Magnet was hired by the institute as editor of the magazine in 1994, where he served until 2007. , the magazine is edited by Brian C. Anderson. Lawrence J. Mone was named president of the institute in 1995, taking over from William H. Hammett. He joined the institute in 1982, serving as a public policy specialist, program director and vice president before being named the institute's fourth president.

The institute established the Center for Education Innovation (CEI) in 1989, which focused on promoting charter schools. The CEI helped create a number of small, alternative public schools in New York and advised New York Governor George Pataki in crafting the state's charter school law in 1998, which authorized the creation of autonomous public schools. The institute thereafter continued to work with school officials to promote the idea of school choice nationwide.

Senior fellow Peter W. Huber published his first book, Liability: The Legal Revolution and Its Consequences, in 1990. The book focused on tort law since the 1960s, arguing that a dramatic increase in liability lawsuits had led to numerous negative outcomes. Later on, Walter Olson's work at the institute included The Litigation Explosion, in 1992.

The institute had ties with the administration of New York City Mayor Rudy Giuliani, who had become a regular at Institute luncheons and lectures after his failed mayoral campaign in 1989. The Spring 1992 Issue of City Journal was devoted to "The Quality of Urban Life", and featured articles on crime, education, housing, and public spaces. The issue caught Giuliani's eye as he prepared to run for mayor again in 1993. The campaign contacted City Journal editor Fred Siegel to develop tutorial sessions for the candidate. Among the policies adopted by his administration was the "broken-windows" theory of policing, which had already begun to be adopted on some levels by leadership in the NYPD.

During the 2000 election, candidate George W. Bush cited Myron Magnet's, The Dream and the Nightmare: The Sixties' Legacy to the Underclass (1993), as having an impact on how he conducted his approach to public policy. Bush went on to say "The Dream and the Nightmare by Myron Magnet crystallized for me the impact the failed culture of the '60s had on our values and society".

Terrorism and social unrest (2001–2009)
After the attacks on the World Trade Center on September 11, 2001, the institute formed the Center for Tactical Counterterrorism (CTCT), later renamed the Center for Policing Terrorism (CPT). The group was created at the request of the NYPD, to provide research into new policing techniques with the goal of retraining officers to become "first preventers" to future mass-casualty attacks.

Eddy brought on board Tim Connors, a West Point and Notre Dame Law School graduate, to oversee the day-to-day operations of the CTCT. The CTCT began publishing reports and white papers on intelligence fusion centers, local counterterrorism strategies, and intelligence-led policing. With help of institute staffers Mark Riebling and Pete Patton, the center produced briefings on terrorist attacks around the world and presented them at weekly meetings with the Counterterrorism Bureau. The institute's counterterrorism strategy also built upon Broken Windows and CompStat policing models by training police in problem-solving techniques, data analysis, and order maintenance.

In January 2005, the CTCT cautioned against the construction of a new United Nations structure over the Queens Midtown Tunnel, which would have increased the value of the tunnel as a potential terrorist target. CTCT, and later CPT, continued publishing research until 2008 when it was absorbed into National Consortium for Advanced Policing.

2009–present
In 2010, Institute senior fellow Steve Malanga (a former Crain Communications executive editor) published Shakedown: The Continuing Conspiracy Against the American Taxpayer.

After the financial crisis of 2007–2008, senior fellow Nicole Gelinas wrote her first book, After the Fall: Saving Capitalism from Wall Street — and Washington (Encounter, 2011). In the book, she argues that after over two decades of broken regulation and the federal government's adoption of a "too big to fail" policy for the largest or most complex financial companies eventually posed an untenable risk to the economy. The institute has also worked closely with others, including Charles W. Calomiris at Columbia Business School. Calomiris criticized the Dodd-Frank financial regulations passed in response to the 2007–2008 financial crisis.

Paul Howard, the institute's former director of health policy, advocated regulatory reform to allow private industry to develop medical devices and pharmaceuticals.

In 2012, Institute senior fellow Kay Hymowitz released Manning Up: How the Rise of Women Has Turned Men into Boys, arguing that too many American men in their 20s have started to prolong adolescence. Governing magazine columnist and urban-policy blogger Aaron Renn also joined the institute in 2012.

Programs

The institute founded its quarterly magazine on urban policy and culture called City Journal in 1990. , it is edited by Brian C. Anderson,; contributors include Heather Mac Donald, Theodore Dalrymple, Nicole Gelinas, Steven Malanga, Edward L. Glaeser, Kay Hymowitz, Victor Davis Hanson, Judith Miller, and John Tierney.

The Adam Smith Society was founded by the institute in 2011. Bloomberg describes it as a nationwide chapter-based association of business school students who “double down on” capitalism. , the organization had nine professional chapters, located in Austin, Boston, Chicago, Dallas, Houston, London, New York City, San Francisco, and Washington, D.C., and 33 student chapters at such schools as the Stanford Graduate School of Business, University of Chicago Booth School of Business, and the Wharton School of the University of Pennsylvania.

Created in 2006, the institute's Veritas Fund for Higher Education was a donor advised fund that invested in universities and professors. The fund invested in courses related to western civilization, the American founding, and political economy.

The institute formed its Project FDA in 2006 to focus on ways to improve FDA regulations. Notable members of the committee include former FDA commissioner Andrew C. von Eschenbach and former Oklahoma senator (now Institute senior fellow) Tom Coburn.

Economics21 (E21) joined the institute in 2013 as the organization's Washington-based research center focused on economic issues and innovative policy solutions, led by the former chief economist of the U.S. Department of Labor during the Reagan administration, Diana Furchtgott-Roth. E21 has a partnership with the Shadow Open Market Committee, which was established in 2009, prior to its association with the institute. The independent group of economists meet twice a year to evaluate the policy choices and actions of the Federal Reserve's Open Market Committee. E21 partners with the Shadow Open Market Committee (SOMC), an independent group of economists, first organized in 1973 by Karl Brunner, from the University of Rochester, and Allan Meltzer, from Carnegie Mellon University, to provide a monetarist alternative to the views on monetary policy and its inflation effects then prevailing at the Federal Reserve and within the economics profession. Its original objective was to evaluate the policy choices and actions of the Federal Open Market Committee (FOMC), but has since broadened its scope to cover a wide range of macroeconomic policy issues.

In 2015, the institute launched SchoolGrades.org, claiming that it was the only grading system that uses a rigorous, common standard to compare schools across the U.S.—accounting for differences in academic standards across states and each school's unique economic profile to provide a comprehensive picture of school performance in core subjects. The institute also launched The Beat in 2015. The Beat is an email that focuses on issues that matter most to New York, drawing on the work of Manhattan Institute scholars: transportation, education, quality of life, and the local goings-on at City Hall.

The Alexander Hamilton Award Dinner was created in 2001 to recognize people who worked to revitalize American cities. It is named after Alexander Hamilton. Throughout the years, the institute has expanded the scope of the prize to leaders on local, state, and national levels, working in public policy, culture, and philanthropy. Past honorees include: Daniel Patrick Moynihan, William F. Buckley Jr., Rudolph Giuliani, Tom Wolfe, Rupert Murdoch, Raymond Kelly, Henry Kissinger, Cardinal Timothy Dolan, Bobby Jindal, Paul Ryan, Jeb Bush, George Kelling, and Eva Moskowitz.

Policy positions and initiatives

The institute supports free-market ideas, focusing on urban policy, education, public finance and pensions, energy and the environment, health policy, legal reform, and economics.

State and local policy
The institute focuses on both national and local issues, including municipal finance, public pensions, infrastructure, welfare, policing, and housing.

The institute pushed for welfare reform in the mid-1990s. On the 20th anniversary of the Personal Responsibility and Work Opportunity Act, the institute published a report by former senior fellow Scott Winship defending the act.

The institute has published multiple books focused on America's cities; in 1997 it published Twenty-First Century City: Resurrecting Urban America, authored by then-Indianapolis Mayor Stephen Goldsmith. In 2015 it published The Next Urban Renaissance. In 2016, it published Retooling Metropolis.

Howard Husock joined the Manhattan Institute in 2006 as vice president of policy research and director of the institute's Social Entrepreneurship Initiative.

Steve Malanga has criticized public-sector unions and said that states like California and New Jersey suffer from political leadership. Cities Malanga has profiled include Stockton, California; Atlantic City, New Jersey; Harrisburg, Pennsylvania; Houston, Texas; and Dallas, Texas.

Josh McGee, vice president at the Laura and John Arnold Foundation, joined the Manhattan Institute as a senior fellow in 2015.

Broken windows theory

The institute supports the broken windows theory, named after a 1982 Atlantic Monthly article "Broken Windows" by James Q. Wilson and George L. Kelling.

Senior fellow Heather Mac Donald argues that crime prevention statistics from the 2008–2009 recession improved as a result of efficient policing, high incarceration rates, more police officers working, data-driven approaches such as CompStat which helps commanders target high-crime areas, and a policy of holding precinct commanders accountable for results. This research opposes the commonly-held notion that crime inevitably spikes when economic conditions worsen. She contends the decline of American cities, beginning during the 1960s, was a result of crime "spiraling out of control". Most recently, Mac Donald has argued that crime rates (or, in some instances, murder rates) have spiked in many urban areas as a result of the "Ferguson Effect": the tendency, in the aftermath of 2014's riots in Ferguson, Missouri, for police officers to engage in less proactive policing for fear of generating backlash from local populations or the media. Mac Donald has controversially argued that the consequences of this trend adversely affect African-American communities, stating that "there is no government agency more dedicated to the idea that black lives matter than the police".

In the 2010s, according to Fox News, institute employees were embedded in the Detroit Police Department, assisting in the implementation of Broken Windows theories. The institute funded an outreach team that shared its perspective on criminology and policy implementation with the Detroit Police Department, focusing on the "broken windows" approach. The institute is associated with CompStat, a police management approach focused on crime analysis, information sharing, and accountability. George Kelling, the institute's loaned executive to the City of Detroit, and Michael Allegretti, the institute's director of state and local programs, implemented two pilot programs in the Northwest neighborhood of Grandmont-Rosedale and the Northeast neighborhood of East English Village. One source reported that in the first year following implementation, "home invasions dropped 26 percent".

Education, charter schools and vouchers
Institute senior fellow Beth Akers wrote Game of Loans: The Rhetoric and Reality of Student Debt (2016), which says that the student loan system is simply far too complex for the average student or parent borrower to navigate well. She argues that the department of education should simplify federal financial aid, adopt a single, income-driven repayment plan for federal student loans, and bring market-based approaches into student lending.

Former senior fellow Jay P. Greene's research on school choice was cited four times in the U.S. Supreme Court's decision in Zelman v. Simmons-Harris, which affirmed the constitutionality of school vouchers.

In March 1989, the institute employed Seymour "Sy" Fliegel as a senior fellow and launched the Center for Educational Innovation (CEI). Fliegel and Institute senior fellow James Macguire wrote a book, The Miracle of East Harlem: The Fight for Choice in Public Education, to demonstrate how education reform can be achieved one school at a time.

Energy and environment
In 2005, Institute senior fellows Peter Huber and Mark Mills released the book The Bottomless Well, which disputes several popular beliefs about energy.

Former senior fellow Oren Cass has claimed that the popular conception of climate change as posing an existential threat to modern civilization is not supported by climate science or economics. In 2018, The New York Times reported that EPA director Scott Pruitt had solicited a meeting with Cass, who told the newspaper that he “encourage[s] conservatives to accept mainstream climate science and focus on economic analysis and good public policy.” The New York Times noted that "experts at the institute have expressed skepticism about the projected costs of climate change," but that "the organization does not take a formal position on climate change science."

The institute is largely opposed to government mandates and subsidies and advocates the hydraulic fracturing (fracking) method of extracting natural gas and oil from underground deposits. In response to calls to ban fracking in parts of New York, the institute released a report in 2011 projecting that allowing fracking could "inject over $11 billion into the state economy".

Health policy
Since 2006, the institute's Project FDA has asserted that with modern medicine "on the cusp of a radical transformation" due to breakthroughs in precision medicine, the FDA "has struggled to adapt its regulations to new scientific advances". Senior fellows Paul Howard, Peter Huber, and Tom Coburn have all argued that the FDA could speed up approvals without sacrificing safety. In October 2015, the institute ran a full-page advertisement in the New York Times, reading, "Everyone will be a patient someday". The ad included the signatures of over a dozen industry leaders, all in support of the passage of the 21st Century Cures Act, which was signed into law by President Obama just over a year later, in December 2016.

The institute has taken a critical view of the Affordable Care Act (ACA) since its inception. In 2013, it released its Obamacare Impact Map, a joint project of health policy fellows Paul Howard, Avik Roy, and Yevgeniy Feyman. In 2014, the institute published then senior fellow Avik Roy's proposal for its replacement, titled "Transcending Obamacare". According to Roy, while the ACA delivers on the goal of reducing the number of uninsured Americans, it does so by increasing the cost of U.S. health coverage. More recently, in 2017, the institute released a report by Yevgeniy Feyman advocating the use of 1332 "state innovation" waivers giving states the flexibility to increase choice, competition, and affordability under the ACA.

The institute's health care scholars oppose allowing the federal government to negotiate prices in the Medicare Part D prescription drug program and believe that drug price negotiating has adverse effects in the Veterans Administration.

Institute Senior Fellow Oren Cass goes has argued that the American social safety net's overwhelming emphasis on health care is the unintentional result of skewed incentives. States should therefore be allowed to reroute Medicaid funding to other programs that would more effectively meet the needs of the poor at no extra cost. In a 2017 article for National Review, Cass responded to accusations that repealing the Affordable Care Act would lead to otherwise preventable deaths by writing "In reality, the best statistical estimate of the number of lives saved each year by the ACA is zero".

Legal reform 
The institute's legal scholars author policy papers on various aspects of legal reform. The Center for Legal Policy regularly writes on overcriminalization, corporate governance, and civil litigation reform. Corporate governance reports usually focus on proxy voting records. Overcriminalization issue briefs typically study the growth of the criminal law in state penal codes. Proposed reforms to America's lawsuit practice are published under the center's ongoing publication of Trial Lawyers, Inc.

Overcriminalization
In 2014, the institute began to study the issue of overcriminalization, the idea that state and federal criminal codes are overly expansive and growing too quickly. At the federal level alone, Institute fellows have identified over 300,000 laws and regulations whose violation can lead to prison time. The institute asserts that this puts even well-meaning citizens in danger of prosecution for seemingly innocuous conduct. From 2014 to 2016, the institute produced reports on the status of overcriminalization in five states (North Carolina, Michigan, South Carolina, Minnesota, and Oklahoma) and is continually adding more state-specific research.

Prisoner reentry in Newark

In Newark, New Jersey, the institute partnered with Mayor Cory Booker to implement a new approach to prisoner reentry, based on the principle of connecting ex-offenders with paid work immediately upon release. As the mayor of Newark, Booker sought to remedy a problem familiar to those in the community: prisoner reentry. A study by William Eimicke, Maggie Gallagher, Stephen Goldsmith for the institute, Moving Men into the Mainstream: Best Practices in Prisoner Reentry, found that the most successful prisoner-reentry programs were those that employed the work-first model. Booker's staff, and Richard Greenwald, a specialist in the development of workforce, implemented Newark's Prisoner Reentry Initiative (NPRI). As of November 2011, the agencies that contracted with the city through NPRI had enrolled 1,436 program participants, exceeding the benchmark set by the Department of Labor. Provider organizations have placed more than 1,000 people in unsubsidized jobs, with an average hourly wage of $9.32.

Governor Chris Christie thereafter announced his plan to reform the state's prison system, and sought the institute's analysis of the current system. The final report included a set of recommendations on addressing drug offenses and recidivism, and better aligning New Jersey agencies around a successful reentry strategy.

Economics
Given the concern about economic inequality among mainstream academics and commentators, especially since the Great Recession and the release of Thomas Piketty's bestselling Capital in the Twenty-First Century, the institute has produced several pieces of research on this and the related issue of economic mobility in the U.S. In 2014, former senior fellow Scott Winship produced a report, "Inequality Does Not Reduce Prosperity", which examined evidence from across the globe. This report contended that larger increases in inequality correspond with sharper rises in living standards for the middle class and poor alike, while greater inequality in developed nations tends to accompany stronger economic growth. In a 2015 report, Winship examined the state of economic and residential mobility in the U.S., finding that people who move from their birth states fare better economically than those who stay put. He argues that the U.S. should focus on policies to improve mobility in order to expand opportunities among disadvantaged groups.

Diana Furchtgott-Roth, formerly a senior fellow, has argued for a reduction in the corporate tax rate and a move to a territorial tax system, in order to make the U.S. more economically competitive on the world stage. In 2015, Roth, together with former fellow Jared Meyer, published the book, Disinherited: How America Is Betraying America's Young, arguing that millennials' plight is the result of government policies that are systematically stacked against young Americans to the benefit of older generations.

The institute has criticized plans to expand the federal minimum wage. In 2015, it published a report by American Action Forum's Douglas Holtz-Eakin and Ben Gitis, which made the case that an increase of the federal minimum wage to $15 per hour by 2020 would cost 6.6 million jobs. A 2016 report by Oren Cass argued that these deleterious effects are mainly due to the fact that increases in the federal minimum fail to account for differences in local conditions: not all labor markets are the same. Cass has also argued for the introduction of a federal wage subsidy—additional dollars per hour worked delivered via one's paycheck—as a better third way to help low-income workers. In 2015, he wrote that a wage subsidy is superior to both the minimum wage and Earned Income Tax Credit (EITC) because it incentivizes workforce participation and delivers benefits directly to workers, without distorting the labor market.

Notable people

 John Avlon (former senior fellow)
 Rick Baker, former mayor of St. Petersburg, FL
 Josh Barro (former senior fellow)
 Herman Badillo (former senior fellow)
 Lester Brickman, visiting scholar
 Richard Epstein, visiting scholar
 Floyd Flake, fellow; religious leader and former U.S. Representative (D-NY)
 Daniel DiSalvo, fellow
 David Frum (former senior fellow)
 Diana Furchtgott-Roth, senior fellow
 David Gratzer, senior fellow
 Regina Herzlinger, professor at Harvard Business School
 Peter W. Huber, senior fellow
 Coleman Hughes, fellow
 Howard Husock, vice president, research and publications
 John Leo (former senior fellow)
 George L. Kelling, adjunct fellow, Center for Civic Innovation
 Bill Kristol, board of trustees member
 James Manzi, senior fellow
 John McWhorter (former senior fellow)
 Charles Murray (former senior fellow)
 Walter Olson (former senior fellow)
 James Piereson, senior fellow
 Jason L. Riley, senior fellow
 Avik Roy (former senior fellow)
 Reihan Salam, president
 Paul Singer, board of trustees chair
 Abigail Thernstrom (former senior fellow)
 Stephan Thernstrom (former senior fellow)

Notable City Journal people

 Brian C. Anderson, editor of City Journal
 Theodore Dalrymple, contributing editor
 Victor Davis Hanson, contributing editor
 Edward Glaeser, senior fellow and contributing editor
 Kay Hymowitz, senior fellow and contributing editor
 Andrew Klavan, contributing editor
 Heather Mac Donald, senior fellow and contributing editor
 Myron Magnet, editor-at-large
 Steven Malanga, senior fellow and senior editor
 Judith Miller, adjunct fellow and contributing editor
 Christopher Rufo, senior fellow and contributor
 Fred Siegel, senior fellow and contributing editor
 Guy Sorman, contributing editor
 Harry Stein, contributing editor
 John Tierney, contributing editor
 Luigi Zingales, contributing editor

See also

 City Journal
 Empire Center for Public Policy

References

Further reading
 Fred Kaplan, Conservatives plant a seed in NYC Boston Sunday Globe, Sunday February 22, 1998
 Janny Scott, "Turning Intellect Into Influence: Promoting Its Ideas, the Manhattan Institute Has Nudged New York Rightward", New York Times, Monday May 12, 1997
 Jennifer Medina, "A Reversal on School Vouchers, Then a Tempest", New York Times, Feb. 13, 2008.

External links
 Official site
 The Center for the American University
 Organizational Profile – National Center for Charitable Statistics (Urban Institute)
 Minding the Campus
 The Beat (Manhattan Institute newsletter)
 

 
Political and economic think tanks in the United States
Think tanks established in 1977
Conservative organizations in the United States
Universities and colleges accredited by the Council on Occupational Education
1977 establishments in New York City
Organizations based in Manhattan